Trimontium may refer to:
 Trimontium (Newstead), an ancient Roman fort at Newstead, Borders, Scotland
 Plovdiv, Bulgaria, the capital of the ancient Roman province of Thrace